Kraski is a Russian-language pop / Eurodance musical band from Belarus.

The band was formed on 1 January 2001, in Minsk, and since 2003 is based in Moscow. Kraski launched five studio albums in the early 2000s, time in which the band had a big popularity in Russia and CIS, with many songs in tops of the musical charts. Band producer and songwriter is Alexey Voronov.

In 2011, Kraski single «Ты уже взрослый», aka Старший Брат (Ty uzhe vzroslyi / Starshii brat) was named by Afisha magazine as one of the most remarkable and memorable hits of the latest 20 years in Russian music.

Discography

Albums 
 Ты уже взрослый (Nov. 2001), re-launched as Старший брат: желтый альбом (May 2002)
 Я люблю тебя, Сергей: красный альбом (2003)
 Оранжевое солнце: оранжевый альбом (2003)
 Весна: синий альбом (2004)
 Те, кто любит: фиолетовый альбом (2004)

Collaborative projects 
 ЯК-40 и Краски (2001) — «Ты у меня одна»
 Краски и Viza Незалежнай Рэспублікі Мроя (2003) — «Тры чарапахі»
 Краски и Андрей Губин (2004) — «Те, кто любит»

Members

Current members
 Dasha Subbotina: vocal
 Vitali Kondrakov: keyboards
 Denis Barvinok: keyboards

Former members
 Ekaterina (Katya) Borovik: vocal, 2001
 Oksana Kovalevskaya: vocal, 2002–2006
 Vasily Bogomya: keyboards, 2001–2003
 Andrei Chighir: keyboards, 2001–2003
 Dmitry Orlovsky: keyboards, 2003–2006
 Katya Sasha: vocal 2006–2011

Chronology

References
All in Russian language

Literature

External links 

 

Belarusian pop music groups
Russian pop music groups
Eurodance groups
Musical groups established in 2001